KUNA may refer to:

 KUNA-FM, a radio station (96.7 FM) licensed to La Quinta, California, United States
 KUNA-LD, a low-power television station (channel 15) licensed to Indio, California, United States
 Kuwait News Agency